Gaozhi Xiao is an electrical engineer with the National Research Council Canada in Ottawa, Ontario. He was named a Fellow of the Institute of Electrical and Electronics Engineers (IEEE) in 2015 for his contributions to the development of safety and security monitoring instrumentation and measurement technologies.

References 

Fellow Members of the IEEE
Living people
Year of birth missing (living people)
Place of birth missing (living people)